Perebea rubra  is a species of plant in the genus Perebea of the family Moraceae.

Habitat
Perebea rubra is a semi-aquatic terrestrial plant.

References

rubra